AKM Nurul Karim Khair is a Awami League politician and the former Member of Parliament of Bakerganj-11.

Career
Khair was elected to parliament from Bakerganj-11 as an Awami League candidate in 1973.

References

Awami League politicians
Living people
1st Jatiya Sangsad members
Year of birth missing (living people)
People from Barisal District